The Pittsburgh and Western Railroad  was a nineteenth-century,  narrow gauge railroad connecting Pittsburgh with coal supplies and the oil field around Titusville, Pennsylvania. Its right-of way formed the main line of the Baltimore and Ohio Railroad west from Pittsburgh. It was reorganized in 1889 under Malcolm A. McDonald.

The railroad constructed another  narrow gauge line from Callery Junction to Foxburg, Pennsylvania.  This line would later become known as the Northern Subdivision of the Baltimore and Ohio Railroad (B&O). In 1883 the railroad took control of the line from Foxburg to Mount Jewett after the Pittsburgh, Bradford and Buffalo Railroad had financially flopped.  The railroad would later merge with the Bradford, Bordell and Kinzua Railroad, and the Big Level and Kinzua Railroad.  These mergers would prove to be ineffective; by 1902 these joint railways were in financial ruin.

The Bradford, Bordell and Kinzua Railroad handled significant interchange traffic with standard gauge lines by use of truck exchange.  Cars were hoisted at interchange points and trucks were rolled out and replaced with new ones of the appropriate gauge.  On at least one occasion, the blocking used to adapt a standard-gauge car to narrow gauge trucks failed, leading to a fatal accident.

In 1902, the Baltimore and Ohio Railroad (B&O) took control of the P&W. By 1911, the P&W was dissolved, and the B&O took over all operations. That same year, most of the narrow gauge was converted to  track. The B&O would continue to operate the line until 1982 when it was acquired by Sloan Cornell of the Knox and Kane Railroad.

Trackage between Ribold and Butler, Pennsylvania, as well as the Petrolia Branch is used by the Buffalo and Pittsburgh Railroad. The Clarion Junction-Kane section ceased operations in 2006; it was abandoned in 2008 when the Knox and Kane Railroad was sold at auction.

See also

 Northern Subdivision (Pennsylvania)
 P&W Subdivision

References

Further reading 
Burns, Robert W., Ex-Baltimore & Ohio Lines in Northwestern Pennsylvania, Robert W. Burns, 1999.

History of Allegheny County, Pennsylvania
Defunct Ohio railroads
Defunct Pennsylvania railroads
Transportation in Pittsburgh
Narrow gauge railroads in Pennsylvania
3 ft gauge railways in the United States
Predecessors of the Baltimore and Ohio Railroad
Railway companies established in 1879
Railway companies disestablished in 1887
Railway companies established in 1902
American companies disestablished in 1887
American companies established in 1879